James Henry Nation (born 23 September 1976, in Waipukurau) is a field hockey player from New Zealand who earned his first cap for the national team, nicknamed The Black Sticks, in 2001 against Malaysia. The midfielder provides support at centre and left half and is also an attacking penalty corner option. He made his test debut in 2001, but did not make the team to the Commonwealth Games a year later.

Nation represented his native country at two Summer Olympics: in 2004 in Athens and 2008 in Beijing.

Nation plays representative hockey for Wellington and was part of the team that won the national title in 2002. The resident of London plays for Teddington in the English Premier League.

International Senior Tournaments
 2004 – Olympic Qualifying Tournament
 2004 – Summer Olympics
 2004 – Champions Trophy
 2005 – Sultan Azlan Shah Cup
 2006 – Commonwealth Games
 2006 – World Cup
 2008 – Olympic Games

References

External links
 

New Zealand male field hockey players
Olympic field hockey players of New Zealand
Male field hockey midfielders
Field hockey players at the 2004 Summer Olympics
Field hockey players at the 2006 Commonwealth Games
2006 Men's Hockey World Cup players
Field hockey players at the 2008 Summer Olympics
1976 births
Living people
People from Waipukurau
Commonwealth Games competitors for New Zealand
Sportspeople from the Hawke's Bay Region